{{speciesbox
| taxon = Streptomyces cyaneofuscatus
| authority = (Kudrina 1957) Pridham et al. 1958 (Approved Lists 1980)
| type_strain = AS 4.1612, ATCC 19746, ATCC 23619, BCRC 11467, CBS 112.60, CBS 485.68, CCRC 11467, CGMCC 4.1612, DSM 40148, ETH 24190, IFO 13190, IMET 41583, INA 99/54, ISP 5148, JCM 4364, KCC S-0364, KCCS-0364, NBRC 13190, NCIMB 13021, NRRL B-2570, NRRL-ISP 5148, RIA 1027, UNIQEM 133, VKM Ac-752, VTT E-072752
| synonyms =
 "Actinomyces cyaneofuscatus'" Kudrina 1957
 Streptomyces cavourensis subsp. washingtonensis Skarbek and Brady 1978 (Approved Lists 1980)
}}Streptomyces cyaneofuscatus is a bacterium species from the genus of Streptomyces which has been isolated from soil in Daghestan in Russia.Deutsche Sammlung von Mikroorganismen und Zellkulturen  Streptomyces cyaneofuscatus'' can be used for valinomycin biosynthesis.

Further reading

See also 
 List of Streptomyces species

References

External links
Type strain of Streptomyces cyaneofuscatus at BacDive -  the Bacterial Diversity Metadatabase

cyaneofuscatus
Bacteria described in 1958